Keezhanthoor   is a village in Idukki district in the state of Kerala, India. The village is in the western ghats and is known for growing apples. A Mariyamman Temple and a Vinayagar Temple are the places of devotion

Demographics
As of 2011 Census, Keezhanthoor village had population of 4,205 of which 2,082 are males and 2,123 are females. In Keezhanthoor, 9.6% of the population was under 6 years of age. Keezhanthoor had an average literacy of 73.7% lower than the national average of 74% and state average of 94%.

References

Villages in Idukki district